Vutukuru Brahma Reddy Residential English Medium High School (VBREMHS) is a co-education high school in Dhanalakshmi Puram, Nellore, Andhra Pradesh, India. It was established in 1997 by Sri. Vutukuru Brahma Reddy and provided instruction in English. The school's Chairman is Sri. Vutukuru Brahma Reddy, Vice Chairman Mr. Vutukuru Sreenivasulu Reddy, Dr. Vutukuru Satyanarayana Reddy and Director & Principal is Mr.Katam Srinivasulu Reddy.

Location
The school is located in 4th Mile, Muthukur Road, Dhanalakshmi Puram, Nellore, 524002.

Infrastructure
It also has a library that has more than 2000 books, a reading room, an art room and an indoor sports room. The round building houses the boys hostel, girls hostel, computer lab, Principal's room, visitors room, audio visual room and the office room. Also enclosed in the campus is a temple (mandir) for conducting religious and service activities.

Management
This school is established in 1997 and recognized by Govt. of Andhra Pradesh. The chairman of the governing body is Sri.Vutukuru Brahma Reddy. 
The Vice Chairman of the governing body are Sri.Vutukuru Sreenivasulu Reddy, Dr.Vutukuru Satyanarayana Reddy and The Director and Principal of the governing body is Sri. Katam Srinivasulu Reddy.

Faculty

Facilities

Academics
The school runs under the CBSE system of education teaching from play class through standard 10. The school follows comprehensive evaluation system for the primary sections so as to avoid the examination stress. The school achieved an aggregate of 100% for the academic year 2014-2015 in the CBSE standard 10 board examinations. Out of the 187 students that appeared for the exam in 2015 students 9 students secured 10 CGPA (Cumulative Grade Point Average), 26 students secured 9.7 CGPA, 28 students secured 9.6 CGPA,25 students secured 9.5 CGPA. Overall 125 students secured 9 CGPA. During the academic years 2014-15, 2013–14 and 2012–13 students that appeared Class X CBSE Board Exam the school achieved of 100% pass results along with 10 CGPA (Cumulative Grade Point Average).

Extra-curricular
The school has with tennis and chess equipment in the indoor sports room.

The 'Saturday Special' is held on the last Saturday of every month in which the students compete against the students of other houses in events like quiz, dumb charades, singing, and playing musical instruments.

The school has an audio-visual room which houses musical instruments and audio equipment. Devotional and refreshing music is played during recess and during the morning assembly.

Morning assembly
The school's morning assembly includes talks by faculty and students, and music sessions. Other days morning assemblies includes singing songs of all the religions, and chanting of hymn.

Awards
The students of the school won 'PRATIBHA' Award for the year 2006-07 (G.Kavya) and 2007–2008 (L. Manoj Kumar) by Govt. of Andhra Pradesh.

External links
V.B.R English medium school
Note:This site is under development.

High schools and secondary schools in Andhra Pradesh
Schools in Nellore district
Educational institutions established in 1997
1997 establishments in Andhra Pradesh